Ben O'Keefe is a professional rugby league footballer who plays as a  or er for the Rochdale Hornets in the Betfred League 1.

Personal
Ben is the son of former Rochdale Hornets player, Paul O'Keefe.

Playing Career

Wigan Warriors
In 2022 O'Keefe made his Super League début for the Warriors against Hull Kingston Rovers.

Rochdale Hornets
He has spent time on loan from Wigan at the Rochdale Hornets in Betfred League 1, and made it a permanent move for the 2023 season.

References

External links
Wigan Warriors profile

2002 births
Living people
English rugby league players
Rugby league centres
Rugby league players from Rochdale
Rochdale Hornets players
Wigan Warriors players